The H-16-66 was a 1,600 horsepower (1.2 MW) locomotive, with a C-C wheel arrangement that was manufactured by Fairbanks-Morse from January, 1951 until October, 1958 as a smaller alternative to their better known FM H-24-66 "Train Master" locomotive.  With an 8 cylinder prime mover developing 1600hp compared to the H-24-66's 2400hp from as 12 cylinder engine, the H-16-66 was commonly referred to as the "Baby Train Master".  Although sharing a common model designation, four different carbody variants existed with a total of only 59 locomotives produced.

Preserved units 
Former Alcoa H-16-66 #721001 is privately owned, and since 12 November 2012 has been located adjacent to the Canadian Pacific Railway rail yard at Nelson, British Columbia. Although never on the roster of the CPR, it has been repainted in the CPR's 1950s and 1960s "Tuscan and Grey" colour scheme, and bears the fictional numbering CPR 7009.  This corresponds to the last in a number series formerly reserved for diesel demonstrators on the CPR.  It is coupled to CPR C-liner 4104, which has also been repainted in the tuscan and grey colour scheme. The "Baby Train Master" and C-liner have been placed on static display beside the restored historic Nelson CPR station.  The siting of these locomotives here is fitting, as the CPR division around Nelson was one of the final redoubts of Fairbanks-Morse / Canadian Locomotive Company power in North America, and the former Nelson shop was among the last to specialize in the maintenance of these units.

The Tennessee Valley Railroad Museum added unit F3060 (originally number 24) to its collection thanks to a donation from the Tennessee Valley Authority. The unit was built in October, 1958 and spent its entire working life at TVA’s Gallatin Power Plant near Gallatin, Tennessee until its retirement in 1997. Plans are for the locomotive to be moved and displayed in time for the start of the museum’s year-long 60th anniversary celebration beginning Oct. 14, 2021.

Units produced by Fairbanks-Morse (1951–1958)

References
 
 
 
 

Diesel-electric locomotives of the United States
C-C locomotives
H-16-66
Railway locomotives introduced in 1951
Freight locomotives
Standard gauge locomotives of the United States